Sriranjani (22 February 1927 – 27 April 1974) was an Indian actress active in Telugu and Tamil films. She was the younger sister of Sriranjani. She is known mainly for her tragedy roles particularly as the long-suffering wife.

Life in Brief
Sriranjani was born in Murikipudi village of Guntur district, Andhra Pradesh. Her elder sister, Senior Sriranjani was also an actress and is the first Sita of the Telugu screen. Her birth name is Mahalakshmi. She had grown up with her elder sister and developed interest in movies and acting. Chitrapu Narayana Murthy encouraged her and gave her chance to act in the film Bhishma in 1944. She subsequently acted in Gollabhama, Brahmachari, Gitanjali, Madalasa, Laila Majnu etc., Her life turned brighter as a heroine character in Gunasundari Katha in 1949, directed by famous K. V. Reddy. In this film her Gunasundari character established her in the industry. She subsequently acted in the Tamil version of Gunasundari Katha and obtained critical reviews. She acted as heroine in the magnum opus Chandraharam. Though she acted in many films like Mantradandam, Sankranthi, Prema, Bratuku Teruvu, Svayamprabha, Ramanjaneya Yuddham her best portrayal was the all-time hit of Gunasundari Katha.

In her Tamil film Parasakthi (1952), Sriranjani portrayed the male ideal of virtuous Hindu womanhood. In the same year, she also starred with MGR in the movie Kumari. Another serious role of Sriranjani was as Chandra (the wife of the hero, a lothario who suffers from leprosy) in Ratha Kanneer, a 1954 Tamil movie. Sriranjani played Rajee in the Tamil film Rajee En Kanmani (1954). The film is based on the City Lights (1931) of Charlie Chaplin.

She retired from films in 1960, but returned for a few guest roles. She died in 1974.

Rathakaneer 1954

Penn Kulathin Pon Vilakku (1959)

 Inti Kodalu (1974)
 Galipatalu (1974)
 Jeevana Tarangalu (1973)
 Bhakta Tukaram (1973)
 Jeevitha Chakram (1971)
 Bhale Tammudu (1969)
 Aggi Meeda Guggilam (1968)
 Nenante Nene (1968)
 Bangaru Panjaram (1965)
 Sri Krishnarjuna Yudham (1963)
 Mahakavi Kalidasu (Telugu, 1960)
 Krishna Leelalu (1959)
 Arasala Pirandavan (1958) (dubbed version of Mantra Dandam
 Vaddante Pelli (1957) as Gowri
 Preme Daivam (1957)
 Penki Pellam (1956)
 Uma Sundari (1956)
 Santhanam (1955)
 Shri Krishna Tulabharam (1955)
 Ratha Kanneer (1954)
 Chandraharam (1954)
 Amarasandesam (1954)
 Peddamanushulu (1954)
 Rajee En Kanmani (1954)

 Thilakam (1959)
 Orey Vazhi (1959)
 Bratuku Teruvu (1953)
 Kathal (1952)
 Manavati (1952)
 Parasakthi (1952)
 Prema (1952)
 Rajeshwari (1952)
 Kumari (1952)
 Sankranti (1952)
 Mantra Dandam (1951)
 Vali Sugriva (1950)
 Laila Majnu (1949)
 Gunasundari Katha (1949)
 Gitanjali (1948)
 Madalasa (1948)
 Gollabhama (1947)
 Brahma Ratham (1947)
 Grihapravesham (1946)
 Bhishma (1944)

References

 Luminaries of 20th Century, Potti Sreeramulu Telugu University, 2005.

External links
 

Indian film actresses
Actresses in Tamil cinema
Actresses in Telugu cinema
1927 births
1974 deaths
People from Guntur district
20th-century Indian actresses
Actresses from Andhra Pradesh